Lophocampa nimbifacta is a moth of the family Erebidae. It was described by Harrison Gray Dyar Jr. in 1912. It is found in Mexico.

Description
Dyar's original description from 1912:

References

 
Halisidota nimbifacta at BHL
Lophocampa nimbifacta at BOLD Systems

nimbifacta
Moths described in 1912